Al Ayam (Arabic for "The Days") may refer to:
Al Ayam (Bahrain), newspaper
Al Ayam (Sudan), newspaper

See also
Al-Ayyam (disambiguation)